Inner Secrets is the tenth studio album by Santana. It was released in 1978 and, unlike the fusion of Latin, jazz, rock, blues and spirituality that characterized previous records, it was considered an album-oriented rock album.  

"Stormy" and "One Chain (Don't Make No Prison)" were both hit singles. In the Netherlands "Well All Right" was released as a single and reached #22 in the top 40.  

Most CD releases of Inner Secrets use a different version of track 3, "One Chain (Don't Make No Prison)", than the one that appeared on the original LP, Columbia FC 35600. The version used on most CD releases is an extended disco mix (running time 7:10), that appeared on a 12” single (Columbia 23-10957). The original album version of the track is available on CD in a Japanese Mini LP sleeve, Sony Music SICP 2875, released in 2010 (running time 6:13).

Cover songs on the album
Several of the album's tracks are covers:
 The "Dealer" portion of "Dealer/Spanish Rose" is a cover of the song "Dealer" by Traffic appearing on their 1967 album, Mr. Fantasy
 "One Chain (Don't Make No Prison)" is a cover of a Four Tops song "One Chain Don't Make No Prison" appearing on their 1974 album Meeting of the Minds, and as a single on the same year
 "Well All Right" is a cover of the Buddy Holly song "Well... All Right" (appearing as B-side of Holly's 1958 single "Heartbeat") and it was covered earlier by Blind Faith on their 1969 self-titled and only studio album Blind Faith
 "Stormy" is a cover of the Classics IV's 1968 top-10 hit (Hot 100 No. 5) and included on their 1968 album Mamas and Papas/Soul Train, and 1970 album Stormy

The only two tracks on the album that were not released as singles are "Dealer/Spanish Rose" and "The Facts of Love".

The album cover photo by Norman Seeff divided the nine-piece lineup between the front and back cover, with Chris Solberg, Pete Escovedo, Raul Rekow and Greg Walker shown with Carlos Santana on the front while David Margen, Armando Peraza, Graham Lear and Chris Rhyne appeared on the back.

Track listing

Side one
 "Dealer/Spanish Rose" (Jim Capaldi/Carlos Santana) – 5:50
 "Move On" (Santana, Chris Rhyne) – 4:27
 "One Chain (Don't Make No Prison)" (Dennis Lambert, Brian Potter) – 6:13
 "Stormy" (Buddy Buie, James Cobb) – 4:45

Side two
 "Well All Right" (Norman Petty, Buddy Holly, Jerry Allison, Joe B. Mauldin) – 4:09
 "Open Invitation" (Santana, Lambert, Potter, Greg Walker, David Margen) – 4:45
 "Life Is a Lady/Holiday" (Lambert/Santana) – 3:47
 "The Facts of Love" (Lambert, Potter) – 5:28
 "Wham!" (Santana, Graham Lear, Armando Peraza, Raul Rekow, Pete Escovedo) – 3:24

CD Reissue
 "Dealer/Spanish Rose" (Capaldi/Santana) – 5:50
 "Move On" (Santana, Rhyne) – 4:27
 "One Chain (Don't Make No Prison)" (Extended disco version) (Lambert, Potter) – 7:13
 "Stormy" (Buie, Cobb) – 4:45
 "Well All Right" (Petty, Holly, Allison, Mauldin) – 4:09
 "Open Invitation" (Santana, Lambert, Potter, Walker, Margen) – 4:45
 "Life Is a Lady/Holiday" (Lambert/Santana) – 3:47
 "The Facts of Love" (Lambert, Potter) – 5:28
 "Wham!" (Santana, Lear, Peraza, Rekow, Escovedo) – 3:24

Personnel
 Greg Walker – lead vocals
 Carlos Santana – guitar, backing vocals
 Chris Solberg – guitar, backing vocals
 Chris Rhyne – keyboards
 David Margen – bass
 Graham Lear – drums
 Armando Peraza – percussion, backing vocals
 Raul Rekow – percussion, backing vocals
 Pete Escovedo – percussion
Dennis Lambert - clavinet, backing vocals
Mike Boddicker - synthesizer programming
Technical
Ray Etzler - executive producer
Mick Brigden - artwork, cover concept
 Norman Seeff – design, art director, photography

Charts

Certifications

External links
 Inner Secrets album releases & credits at Discogs.com
 Inner Secrets album user reviews & credits at ProgArchives.com
 Inner Secrets album review by William Ruhlman and releases, credits & Billboard charts at AllMusic.com

References

Santana (band) albums
1978 albums
Albums produced by Carlos Santana
Columbia Records albums